Stranger Things Have Happened is the nineteenth studio album by American country music artist Ronnie Milsap, released in 1989. The album produced four singles, two of which claimed the top spot on the Billboard country singles chart, including "A Woman in Love" and "Don't You Ever Get Tired (Of Hurting Me)." The other singles, included "Houston Solution" and the title track, which peaked at #4 and #2 respectively.  Of especial note is the song "You Snap Your Fingers (And I'm Back in Your Hands)", which made an appearance once before in his career on his album from 13 years prior.

Stranger Things Have Happened reached #20 on Country album charts.

Track listing

Personnel
 Acoustic and electric pianos – Ronnie Milsap, Hargus "Pig" Robbins, Jay Spell
 Synthesizers – Mitch Humphries, Shane Keister
 Acoustic guitar – Mark Casstevens, Don Potter, Billy Joe Walker Jr.
 Electric guitar – Bruce Dees, Steve Gibson, Reggie Young
 Pedabro – Paul Franklin
 Steel guitar – Bruce E. Brooks, Weldon Myrick
 Bass guitar – Warren Gowers, Mike Leech, Bob Wray
 Drums – Eddie Bayers, Larrie Londin
 Fiddle – Mark O'Connor
 Lead vocals – Ronnie Milsap
 Background vocals – Carol Chase, Bruce Dees, Ronnie Milsap, Cindy Richardson-Walker, Lisa Silver, Dennis Wilson

Chart performance

Album

Singles

References
[ Stranger Things Have Happened], Allmusic.
Ronnie Milsap – Stranger Things Have Happened RCA Tracklist, letssingit.com.

1989 albums
Ronnie Milsap albums
RCA Records albums
Albums produced by Tom Collins (record producer)